Campbell T. A. Morgan-Parata (born 1 February 2000) is a New Zealand rugby union player who plays for  in the Bunnings NPC. His position is First five-eighth.

Career 
Born in Porirua, Parata moved to Australia at just 4 years of age where he was educated at The Southport School. He returned to New Zealand in 2019 and started playing club rugby in the Tasman Region for Waimea Old Boys. He was named in the Tasman Mako squad for the 2021 Bunnings NPC. Parata made his debut for Tasman against  at Trafalgar Park in a non competition match, starting in the number 10 jersey in a 26–9 win for the Mako. Parata was signed by Australian Super Rugby side the Western Force on a 3 year deal, he was only part of the development squad in 2022.

References

External links
itsrugby.co.uk profile

New Zealand rugby union players
2000 births
Living people
People from Porirua
Rugby union fly-halves
Tasman rugby union players